The World of Mr. Sweeney is an American sitcom that aired on NBC in primetime and daytime. The series first aired live in primetime from June 30 to August 20, 1954, four nights a week from Tuesday to Friday, and from October 1954 to December 1955 five days a week in daytime. A total of 345 episodes were produced. The series began as a segment on The Kate Smith Evening Hour.

Plot
The series focused on Cicero P. Sweeney, the owner of a small town general store, who always provided advice to his customers. Sweeney's grown daughter, Marge Franklin, and her young son, Kippy, lived with him. Stories revolved around members of the community and Sweeney's solutions to their problems.

Cast
 Charlie Ruggles as Cicero P. Sweeney
  Glenn Walken as Kippy Franklin
 Helen Wagner as Marge Franklin

References

External links
 

NBC original programming
1954 American television series debuts
1955 American television series endings
1950s American sitcoms
American television soap operas
American live television series
Black-and-white American television shows